Echinosphaeria is a genus of fungi in the family Helminthosphaeriaceae.

References

Sordariomycetes genera
Sordariales